Jane Francesca Agnes, Lady Wilde (née Elgee; 27 December 1821 – 3 February 1896) was an Irish poet under the pen name Speranza and supporter of the nationalist movement.  Lady Wilde had a special interest in Irish folktales, which she helped to gather and was the mother of Oscar Wilde and Willie Wilde.

Personal life
Jane was the last of the four children of Charles Elgee (1783–1824), the son of Archdeacon John Elgee, a Wexford solicitor, and his wife Sarah (née Kingsbury, d. 1851). Her father died when she was three years old which meant she was largely self-educated. Even so, she is said to have mastered 10 languages by the age of 18. She claimed that her great-grandfather was an Italian who had come to Wexford in the 18th century; in fact, the Elgees descended from Durham labourers.

On 12 November 1851 she married Sir William Wilde, an eye and ear surgeon (and also a researcher of folklore), in St. Peter's church in Dublin, and they had three children: William Charles Kingsbury Wilde (26 September 1852 – 13 March 1899), Oscar Fingal O'Flahertie Wills Wilde (16 October 1854 – 30 November 1900), and Isola Francesca Emily Wilde (2 April 1857 – 23 February 1867). Her eldest son William Wilde became a journalist and poet, her younger son Oscar Wilde became a prolific and famous writer, and her daughter Isola Wilde died in childhood of a fever. Jane was the grandmother of Oscar's sons Cyril and Vyvyan Holland, and of Willie's daughter Dorothy Wilde.

When her husband died in 1876, the family discovered that he was virtually bankrupt. Jane Wilde - now Lady Wilde, following the knighting of her husband in 1864 - joined her sons, Willie and Oscar, in London in 1879, where she was making a name for himself in literary circles. She lived with her older son in poverty, supplementing their meagre income by writing for fashionable magazines and producing books based on the research of her late husband into Irish folklore. She wrote several books including 'Ancient legends, mystic charms, and superstitions of Ireland' (1887). Her poems are said to have influenced her son Oscar's own work. For example, his 'Ballad of Reading Gaol' has been compared to her poem 'The Brothers' (based on a true story of a trial and execution in the 1798 Rebellion).

In January 1896 Lady Wilde contracted bronchitis and, dying, asked for permission to see Oscar, who was imprisoned in Reading Gaol. Her request was refused. It was claimed that her "fetch" (i.e. her apparition) appeared in Oscar's prison cell as she died at her home, 146 Oakley Street, Chelsea, on 3 February 1896. Her funeral was held on 5 February at Kensal Green Cemetery in London. It was paid for by Oscar, as her older son, Willie Wilde, was penniless. She was buried anonymously in common ground without a headstone. In 1996 she was memoralised in the form of a plaque on the grave of Sir William Wilde in Dublin as 'Speranza of The Nation, writer, translator, poet and nationalist, author of works on Irish folklore, early advocate of equality for women, and founder of a leading literary salon'. In 1999, a monument to her, in the form of a Celtic cross, was erected at Kensal Green Cemetery by the Oscar Wilde Society. (It is located at grid square 147 – Cambridge Avenue South (near Canalside), set back 20 metres from the curved path – opposite SQ.148.)

Activist

Lady Wilde was the niece of Charles Maturin and wrote for the Young Ireland movement of the 1840s, publishing poems in The Nation under the pseudonym of Speranza. Her works included pro-Irish independence and anti-British writing; she was sometimes known as "Speranza of the Nation".  Charles Gavan Duffy was the editor when "Speranza" wrote commentary calling for armed revolution in Ireland. The authorities at Dublin Castle shut down the paper and brought Charles Duffy to court but he refused to name the person who had written the offending article. "Speranza" reputedly stood up in court and claimed responsibility for the article. While the confession was ignored by the authorities, they permanently shut the newspaper down.

Jane was an early advocate of women's rights, and campaigned for better education for women. She invited the suffragist Millicent Fawcett to her home to speak on female liberty. She praised the passing of the Married Women's Property Act of 1883, which prevented a woman from having to enter marriage 'as a bond slave, disenfranchised of all rights over her fortune'.

Scandals

In 1864 Sir William and Lady Wilde were at the centre of a sensational Dublin court case regarding a young woman called Mary Travers, the daughter of a colleague of Sir William's and a long-time patient. Travers claimed that Sir William had drugged her with chloroform and raped her in 1862; when Lady Wilde wrote a letter to Travers's father contesting the allegations, Mary sued her for libel. Mary Travers won the case, although she was only awarded a farthing for damages plus costs. The costs, however, amounted to £2,000.

Works

Biographies

 In 1911 the American-born writer Anna de Brémont, who claimed to have had a close friendship with Lady Wilde, published a memoir entitled Oscar Wilde and His Mother.
 Mother of Oscar: The Life of Jane Francesca Wilde, Joy Melville, John Murray (1994)
 Wilde's Women: How Oscar Wilde Was Shaped by the Women He Knew, Eleanor Fitzsimons, Gerald Duckworth & Co Ltd (16 Oct 2015)
 A Critical Biography of Lady Jane Wilde, 1821?-1896, Irish Revoltionist, Humanist, Scholar and Poet, Karen Sasha Anthony Tipper, Edwin Mellen Press (2002)

References

External links
 
  
 
 Ancient Legends, Mystic Charms, and Superstitions of Ireland by Lady Wilde
 Poems by "Speranza" (Lady Wilde), 1864 – scan of a copy found in the Alumnae Library of Elms College
Poems by "Speranza" (Lady Wilde), 18—at Project Gutenberg
 Poems by Speranza, 2nd ed. – transcription at Victorian Women Writers Project (indiana.edu/vwwp)
 
 
Works by Lady Wilde at Project Gutenberg

1821 births
1896 deaths
19th-century Irish women writers
19th-century Irish writers
19th-century pseudonymous writers
Burials at Kensal Green Cemetery
Irish folklorists
Oscar Wilde
People from Wexford, County Wexford
Irish Anglicans
Protestant Irish nationalists
Pseudonymous women writers